Sanon may refer to:

People 
 Emmanuel Sanon (1951–2008), Haitian footballer known as Manno
 Issuf Sanon (born 1999), Ukrainian basketball player
 Jimmy-Shammar Sanon (born 1997), Haitian footballer
 Kriti Sanon (born 1990), Indian actress
 Roosevelt Sanon (born 1951), Haitian artist
 Thomas Sanon (born 1947), Burkinabé politician and diplomat
 Tudor Sanon (born 1984), Haitian taekwondo athlete
 Valentin Sanon (born 1980), Ivorian tennis player

See also 
 S-Anon, an organization for families of sex addicts 
 Carrefour Sanon, a rural settlement in Haiti